Passova is a Neotropical genus of firetips in the family Hesperiidae.

Species
Passova ganymedes (Bell, 1931) Colombia, Ecuador, Peru
Passova gazera (Hewitson, [1866]) Brazil
Passova gellias (Godman & Salvin, [1893]) Costa Rica, Honduras, Panama
Passova glacia Evans, 1951 French Guiana
Passova greta Evans, 1951 Bolivia, Peru
Passova nigrocephala (Bell, 1934) Colombia
Passova passova (Hewitson, [1866]) Colombia, Peru, Brazil, Guyana, French Guiana
Passova polemon (Hopffer, 1874) Brazil
Passova vilna Evans, 1951 Bolivia

References
Passova - Natural History Museum Lepidoptera genus database

Hesperiidae
Hesperiidae of South America
Hesperiidae genera